Sweetheart Cup Company was a North American company that made paper cups, plastic cups and related products. In 2004, Sweetheart was acquired by the Solo Cup Company, which itself was acquired by Dart Container on May 4, 2012.

History

1911: Predecessor to Maryland Cup founded in Boston by Joseph Shapiro and his three brothers. Company sells ice cream, then expands to bake ice cream cones. Headquarters moves to Baltimore.

1932–1936: Company diversifies, making matches and straws. Sweetheart, the name used on products, is inspired by picture of two children using straws to drink a milkshake from the same glass.

1947: Company executives vote, 14-to-1, against entering the cup business. But Joseph Shapiro votes yes - and the cup business is born.

1961: Maryland Cup goes public, consolidating 32 companies controlled by Shapiro family members.

1968: Joseph Shapiro dies.

1983: Maryland Cup bought by Fort Howard Paper Company, a Wisconsin-based paper manufacturer. At the time, Maryland Cup has 33 plants, more than 10,000 employees and a net worth of $250 million.

1983–1985: Fort Howard boosts capital spending in cup business, while cutting costs through layoffs.

1986: Customer service deteriorates and cup sales start to slide. Fort Howard acquires Lily-Tulip, cup-maker with net worth of $108 million.

1988: Fort Howard itself acquired in leveraged buyout by Morgan Stanley for $3.9 billion.

1989: Fort Howard spins off cup business as Sweetheart Holdings. Business has 15 U.S. factories and more than 8,000 employees.

1991: Sweetheart turns a profit on operations, but saddled by debt, net worth falls to −$95 million.

1992: Sweetheart introduces its Jazz disposable cups, which would become the company's top-grossing stock design as of 2002.

2004: Sweetheart is purchased by Solo Cup Company.

References

External links
http://www.sweetheart.com (Sweetheart's official web page - now redirected to Solo Cup)

Manufacturing companies based in Illinois
Defunct companies based in Illinois
2004 mergers and acquisitions